Earl of Orrery is a title in the Peerage of Ireland that has been united with the earldom of Cork since 1753. It was created in 1660 for the soldier, statesman and dramatist Roger Boyle, 1st Baron Boyle, third but eldest surviving son of Richard Boyle, 1st Earl of Cork. He had already been created Lord Boyle, Baron of Broghill, in the Peerage of Ireland in 1628 (at the age of only six). He was succeeded by his son, the second Earl. He represented County Cork in the Irish House of Commons and served as Vice-President of Munster. On his death, the titles passed to his eldest son, the third Earl. He represented East Grinstead in the English House of Commons. He was succeeded by his younger brother, the fourth Earl. He was a Lieutenant-General in the Army and a prominent diplomat. In 1711 he was created Baron Boyle of Marston, in the County of Somerset, in the Peerage of Great Britain. His son, the fifth Earl, succeeded his third cousin as fifth Earl of Cork in 1753. See the latter title for further history of the peerages.

Henry Boyle, son and namesake of the Hon. Henry Boyle, the younger son of the first Earl of Orrery, was created Earl of Shannon in 1756.

The Irish placename Orrery came from Gaelic Orbhraighe, which was at first the name of a tribe (Orbh-raighe = "Orb's people"), and then of a territory and a barony.

Earls of Orrery (1660)
Roger Boyle, 1st Earl of Orrery (1621–1679)
Roger Boyle, 2nd Earl of Orrery (1646–1682)
Lionel Boyle, 3rd Earl of Orrery (1671–1703)
Charles Boyle, 4th Earl of Orrery (1674–1731)
John Boyle, 5th Earl of Cork and Orrery (1707–1762)
Hamilton Boyle, 6th Earl of Cork and 6th Earl of Orrey (1729–1764)
Edmund Boyle, 7th Earl of Cork and 7th Earl of Orrey (1742–1798)
Edmund Boyle, 8th Earl of Cork and 8th Earl of Orrery (1767–1856)
Richard Edmund St Lawrence Boyle, 9th Earl of Cork and 9th Earl of Orrery (1829–1904)
Charles Spencer Canning Boyle, 10th Earl of Cork and 10th Earl of Orrery (1861–1925)
Robert John Lascelles Boyle, 11th Earl of Cork and 11th Earl of Orrery (1864–1934)
William Henry Dudley Boyle, 12th Earl of Cork and 12th Earl of Orrery (1873–1967)
Patrick Reginald Boyle, 13th Earl of Cork and 13th Earl of Orrery (1910–1995)
John William Boyle, 14th Earl of Cork and 14th Earl of Orrery (1916–2003)
John Richard Boyle, 15th Earl of Cork and 15th Earl of Orrery (born 1945)

The heir apparent is the present holder's only son Rory Jonathan Courtenay Boyle, Viscount Dungarvan (born 1978)

See also
Earl of Shannon
Orrery

Notes

References

Attribution

Kidd, Charles, Williamson, David (editors). Debrett's Peerage and Baronetage (1990 edition). New York: St Martin's Press, 1990, 

Earldoms in the Peerage of Ireland
Noble titles created in 1660
Earl